Lauri Jõeleht (born 14 December 1974 in Tallinn) is an Estonian composer.

In 2003, he finished his master's thesis in composition specialty at Estonian Academy of Music and Theatre.

Since 1996, he is working as a guitar teacher. Since 2014, he is also teaching at Institute of Instrumental and Vocal Pedagogy of the Estonian Academy of Music and Theatre.

Since 2002, he is a member of Estonian Composers' Union.

Works
 

works for solo instrument(s) and orchestra
 "Concerto for Accordion and Chamber Orchestra"
 "A Mystical Hymn of the Medieval"
 "Horizon"

References

1974 births
Living people
21st-century Estonian composers
Estonian Academy of Music and Theatre alumni
Academic staff of the Estonian Academy of Music and Theatre
Musicians from Tallinn